Tamara Lindeman (born November 2, 1984), also known by the name Tamara Hope, is a Canadian actress and musician. Her starring roles include Guinevere Jones and The Nickel Children, as well as a recurring role on CTV's Whistler as Leah McLure. In her music career, in which she is credited as Tamara Lindeman, she has worked with the band Bruce Peninsula and has her own music project, The Weather Station.

Early life 
Hope grew up in Ontario, Canada, in a family that has no other actors. Many of her relatives, including her father, are pilots. She lived in Dufferin County, and she sang in the Orangeville Choir from age 11. At age 12, she was part of the children's choir in the Donny Osmond–led production of Joseph and the Amazing Technicolor Dreamcoat at Toronto's Elgin Theatre. She acted in the play Spring Planting at Theatre Orangeville at age 16.

She enjoyed snowboarding, and as a teenager was a licensed snowboarding teacher. She moved to Toronto in 2002.

Acting career 
Her professional acting began in 1999 with a role in The Audrey Hepburn Story, a made-for-television movie starring Jennifer Love Hewitt which was filmed in Montreal. For her work in The Sandy Bottom Orchestra (2000), she won a Young Artist Award for Best Performance in a TV Movie (Drama) in the category Supporting Young Actress. She had a lead role in the Disney Channel Original Movie Stepsister from Planet Weird. She then played Tilda Swinton's character's daughter in the film The Deep End.

She portrayed Elizabeth I in the HBO production The Royal Diaries: Elizabeth I. In an episode of Twice in a Lifetime in 2000, she played the younger version of Cloris Leachman's character. She had the title role in the Canadian-Australian co-production of Guinevere Jones. In the 2003 TV movie The Piano Man's Daughter, she portrayed a younger version of Stockard Channing's character. For her work in The Nickel Children, a film about teenage prostitution, she was awarded the Breakout Performance Award at the 2005 Method Fest Independent Film Festival. She was a regular cast member of Whistler in 2007, playing snowboarding champion Leah McLure (although she was not permitted to do her own stunts).

In 2009, Hope was featured in the Modernista! ad campaign promoting the Palm Pre phone.

Music career 
In addition to her acting career, Lindeman is active in the Toronto music scene, performing in Bruce Peninsula and leading her own band, The Weather Station. She was a nominee for the 2013 SOCAN Songwriting Prize for "Mule in the Flowers", a song she cowrote with Steve Lambke.

She recorded Loyalty, her third full-length album as The Weather Station, at La Frette studios in Paris, France with Afie Jurvanen of Bahamas and Robbie Lackritz, who has worked on albums with Bahamas, Feist, Zeus and Jason Collett. Loyalty was released on May 5, 2015, on Paradise of Bachelors (worldwide) and Outside Music (Canada).

The Weather Station album Ignorance was released on February 5, 2021. It was described as "a beguiling jazz-folk opus with indie-rock inclinations"

The Weather Station album Ignorance was #7 in the Pitchfork's listing of the best albums of 2021.

Filmography

Film

Television

Discography

Albums with Bruce Peninsula
Debut 7" EP (2008)
A Mountain is a Mouth (2009)
Open Flames (2011)

Albums with The Weather Station
East EP (2008)
The Line (2009)
All of It Was Mine (2011)
Duets #1-3 (2013)
What Am I Going to Do with Everything I Know EP (2014)
Loyalty (2015)
The Weather Station (2017)
Ignorance (2021)
How Is It That I Should Look at the Stars (2022)

Accolades

References

External links
    

1984 births
Living people
Canadian child actresses
Canadian film actresses
Canadian television actresses
Actresses from Toronto
Canadian indie rock musicians
Musicians from Toronto
Canadian songwriters
Writers from Toronto
21st-century Canadian actresses
20th-century Canadian actresses
20th-century Canadian women singers
21st-century Canadian women singers